The 1967 Taça de Portugal Final was the final match of the 1966–67 Taça de Portugal, the 27th season of the Taça de Portugal, the premier Portuguese football cup competition organized by the Portuguese Football Federation (FPF). The match was played on 9 July 1967 at the Estádio Nacional in Oeiras, and opposed two Primeira Liga sides: Académica and Vitória de Setúbal. Vitória de Setúbal defeated Académica 3–2 in a cup final which went to extra-time, which would claim the Sadinos their second Taça de Portugal.

Match

Details

References

1967
Taca
Associação Académica de Coimbra – O.A.F. matches
Vitória F.C. matches